Sheet music is musical notation written on paper.

Sheet music may also refer to:

 Sheet Music (10cc album), 1974
 Sheet Music (Barry White album), 1980
 Sheet Music Plus, an online retailer of sheet music based in California, United States
 Computer sheet music, software for creating, editing, and printing sheet music
 Sheet Music (novel), a 2003 book set in New York City by M. J. Rose
 Sheet Music, a 1998 album by Nancy Sinatra

See also
 Sheet (disambiguation)